The Secretariat of Social Work of the Wife of the President of the Republic of Guatemala ( SOSEP) is the organisation in charge of promoting and implementing social programs that benefit children, families and the community in general. SOSEP works in coordination with the First Lady of the Nation, and the current first lady is Patricia Marroquin, also follows the guidelines she has drawn. It was created on July 14, 1994, during the government of President Jorge Serrano Elías, through government Article 893–91.

References

Government of Guatemala
SOSEP
Guatemala